Juan José González Rivas (born 10 May 1951) is a Spanish jurist and magistrate. He served as President of the Spanish Constitutional Court from 2017 to 2021. He was member of this High Court from 2012 to 2021.

References

1951 births
20th-century Spanish judges
Living people
21st-century Spanish judges